Big Brother (Transliteration:) is the Israeli version of the international reality television franchise Big Brother created by producer John de Mol in 1997. The show is broadcast since 2008, following the premise of other versions of the format, the show features a group of contestants, known as "Housemates" who live together in a specially constructed house that is isolated from the outside world. The housemates are continuously monitored during their stay in the house by live television cameras as well as personal audio microphones. Throughout the competition, housemates are evicted from the house. The last remaining Housemate wins the competition and is awarded a cash prize.

The show was firstly produced by Keshet and aired on Channel 2 from 2008 to 2017 and ran for eight original seasons and two celebrity seasons.

During its run on Channel 2, the show hosted by Erez Tal and Assi Azar from season 1 to season 6. After Assi Azar left the show, Erez Tal and Korin Gideon hosted the show from season 7 to season 8.

At the end of season 7, it was learned that due to ownership changes in the television production companies, at the end of season 8, the broadcast rights of the show would be owned by "Reshet".

After Channel 2 got closed and split into two new channels at the end of October 2017, it was announced that the show would be produced by Reshet and aired on Channel 13 from 2018. Until now have been aired two originals seasons and one celebrity season. A new original season has been announced and it will be begin airing on 2021.

Liron Weizman host the show from season 9 alongside Ofer Shechter and Asi Israelof. In November 2018, it was announced that Guy Zu-Aretz replaced Shechter and Israelof to host the show alongside Liron Weizman from the third celebrity season in 2019.

There have been aired 11 original seasons of Big Brother and 4 celebrity seasons of Big Brother VIP.

Format 

Big Brother is a reality game show and is based on the international Big Brother series produced by Endemol in the Netherlands which began in 1999. The show's name comes from George Orwell's novel Nineteen Eighty-Four (1949), which revolves around a dystopia in which dictator Big Brother is the all-seeing leader. A group of people (called the Housemates) live together in a house, where 24 hours a day their every word and every action is recorded by cameras and microphones in all the rooms in the house. Access to television, the Internet, print media, and time is prohibited. In addition, the housemates live in complete confinement; they have no access to the outside world. At least once a week, the housemates nominate two housemates they wish to face a public vote to evict. The two or more housemates with the most votes face the public vote. The viewing public decides which of them gets evicted through text message votes or phone calls.

Should their stay inside the house become difficult for them to bear, a housemate is allowed to voluntary leave at any time during the game. In the event of a withdrawal from the house, a replacement housemate usually enters in their place.

In the final week of each season, the viewers vote for which of the remaining people in the house should win the prize money and be crowned the winner of Big Brother.

Series details

See also
 Big Brother franchise

References

External links
 Official Website at Reshet
 Official Website at Keshet

 
Channel 2 (Israeli TV channel) original programming
2008 Israeli television series debuts
Channel 13 (Israel) original programming
Israeli television series based on non-Israeli television series